Patrick Pevenage (born 8 November 1956) is a former Belgian racing cyclist. He rode in the 1980 Tour de France.

References

External links

1956 births
Living people
Belgian male cyclists
People from Geraardsbergen
Cyclists from East Flanders